The 1997 European Beach Volleyball Championships were held in August 1997 in Rome, Italy. It was the fifth official edition of the men's event, which started in 1993, while the women competed for the fourth time.

Men's competition

Women's competition

References
 Results

1997
E
B
B